CVHS may refer to:

Schools
 Canyon View High School (disambiguation)
 Central Valley High School (disambiguation)

in Australia
 Canley Vale High School, in Sydney, New South Wales

in the United Kingdom
 Chelmer Valley High School, in Chelmsford, Essex

in the United States
 Capistrano Valley High School, in Mission Viejo, California
 Castle View High School, in Castle Rock, Colorado
 Carnegie Vanguard High School, in Houston, Texas
 Castro Valley High School, in Castro Valley, California
 Centreville High School (Fairfax County, Virginia)
 Chartiers Valley High School, in Bridgeville, Pennsylvania
 Chino Valley High School, in Chino Valley, Arizona
 Chippewa Valley High School, in Clinton Township, Michigan
 Chula Vista High School, in Chula Vista, California
 Clear View High School, in Webster, Texas
 Clearwater Valley High School, in Kooskia, Idaho
 Cleveland High School (North Carolina)
 Coachella Valley High School, in Thermal, California
 Conestoga Valley High School, in Lancaster, Pennsylvania
 Crescent Valley High School, in Corvallis, Oregon
 Crescenta Valley High School, in La Crescenta, California